The following is a timeline of the history of the city of Murfreesboro, Tennessee, United States.

19th century

 1811
 October 27: Cannonsburgh established by state legislature as seat of Rutherford County.
 November 29: Cannonsburgh renamed "Murfreesborough" after military officer Hardy Murfree.
 1817 - Murfreesboro incorporated.
 1818
 Murfreesboro designated Tennessee state capital.
 Population: 950 (estimate).
 1822 - County courthouse burns down.
 1826 - Tennessee state capital moves from Murfreesboro to Nashville.
 1827 - Temperance Society formed.
 1828 - Andrew Jackson visits town.
 1830 - Population: 786.
 1832 - May 7: Tornado.
 1838 - Tennessee Telegraph newspaper begins publication.
 1841 - Union University founded.
 1850 - Population: 1,917.
 1851
 Nashville and Chattanooga Railroad begins operating.
 Murfreesboro Female Institute founded.
 1859 - Eaton College active.
 1862 - December 31: Battle of Stones River begins near Murfreesboro during the American Civil War.
 1869 - Murfreesboro News in publication.
 1872 - Evergreen Cemetery established.
 1892 - Murfreesboro Street Railway begins operating.
 1899 - News-Banner newspaper begins publication.
 1900 - Population: 3,999.

20th century

 1907 - Tennessee College for Women opens.
 1911 - Middle Tennessee State Normal School opens.
 1913 - March 21: Cyclone.
 1927
 Carnation milk factory in business.
 Stones River National Battlefield (historic site) established near Murfreesboro.
 1930 - Population: 7,993.
 1931 - Daily News Journal in publication.
 1940 - Roxy Theatre in business.
 1946 - Radio tower erected.
 1947 - WGNS radio begins broadcasting.
 1948 - Linebaugh Public Library opens.
 1951
 Gulch "slums" razed during urban renewal Broad Street Development Project.
 Swartzbaugh equipment manufactory in business.
 1953 - WMTS radio begins broadcasting.
 1959 - Oaklands Historic House Museum established.
 1965 - Middle Tennessee State University active.
 1968 - March 22: Snowstorm.
 1970
 Westvue urban renewal begins.
 Population: 26,360.
 1974 - Carnation milk factory closes.
 1975 - Marbro Drive-In cinema in business.
 1976 - Cannonsburgh Village (museum) established.
 1990 - Population: 44,922.
 1995 - July 22: "Six people attending an outdoor carnival in Murfreesboro are injured when lightning strikes a nearby power pole."
 2000 - Population: 68,816.

21st century

 2001 - April 15: "High winds topple the steel radio tower for WGNS-AM."
 2003 - Lincoln Davis becomes U.S. representative for Tennessee's 4th congressional district.
 2009 - April: Tornado.
 2010 - Population: 108,755.
 2011 - Scott DesJarlais becomes U.S. representative for Tennessee's 4th congressional district.
 2014
 Shane McFarland becomes mayor.
 "Murfreesboro 2035" city planning process begins.

See also
 Murfreesboro history
 List of mayors of Murfreesboro, Tennessee
 National Register of Historic Places listings in Rutherford County, Tennessee
 Timelines of other cities in Tennessee: Chattanooga, Clarksville, Knoxville, Memphis, Nashville

References

Bibliography

 
  (Includes information about Murfreesboro)
 
 
 
   
 no.2, 1973; no.4, 1974; no.14, 1980; no.24, 1985; no.34, 1994
 
   (Includes information about Murfreesboro)

External links

 
 
 Items related to Murfreesboro, Tennessee, various dates (via Digital Public Library of America)
 

Murfreesboro, Tennessee
Murfreesboro